Yaron Herman (born 12 July 1981) is a French-Israeli jazz pianist living in Paris. He began playing the piano at the age of 16.

Discography

As leader/co-leader

As sideman

References

External links
 Yaron Herman's Official website

1981 births
Living people
People from Tel Aviv
Israeli Jews
Hard bop pianists
Mainstream jazz pianists
Israeli jazz pianists
Avant-garde jazz pianists
21st-century pianists
ACT Music artists
Blue Note Records artists
Decca Records artists
Sunnyside Records artists